Ilya Rahmielevich  Reznik  (born April 4, 1938) is a Russian poet and songwriter, People's Artist of Russia (2003). Honorary member of the Russian Academy of Arts. People's Artist of Ukraine (2013).

Born in Leningrad, he is the lyricist of popular pop songs to the music of Gennady Gladkov, Maksim Dunayevsky, Alexander Zhurbin, Vladimir Feltsman, Raimonds Pauls and other composers, known by Nikolai Karachentsov, Mikhail Boyarsky, Edita Piekha, Alla Pugacheva, Sofia Rotaru, Tamara Gverdtsiteli, Laima Vaikule, Alexander Gradsky, Eugene Martynov, Irina Ponarovskaya and many others. He wrote texts for parodic Viktor Chistyakov.

References

External links
 Official Site
 Резнику пишется легко  Jewish.ru
 Эпиграммы Ильи Резника 

Living people
1938 births
Writers from Saint Petersburg
Russian Jews
Soviet Jews
Soviet poets
Soviet male writers
20th-century Russian male writers
Russian male poets
Recipients of the Order of Honour (Russia)
People's Artists of Russia
Recipients of the title of People's Artists of Ukraine
Russian songwriters
Russian-language poets